Siems is a surname. Notable people with the surname include:

Christa Siems (1916–1990), German film and television actress
Margarethe Siems (1879–1952), German operatic soprano and voice teacher
Ruth Siems (1931–2005), American home economist
Thomas F. Siems, American economist

See also
Siem